Flamant is the French for flamingo.

It may refer to:
Flamant (company), a European interior decoration brand
The Dassault MD 315 Flamant, an aircraft
Flamant class patrol vessel, a type of ship
Flamant solution, the solution to a problem in linear elasticity provided by A. Flamant in 1892

See also 
 Flamand (disambiguation)